Academy of Science Fiction, Fantasy and Horror Films is an American non-profit organization established in 1972 dedicated to the advancement of science fiction, fantasy, and horror in film, television, and home video. The Academy is headquartered in Los Angeles, California, and was founded by Dr. Donald A. Reed.

The Academy distributes its Saturn Awards annually to the best films of the genres. The award was initially and is still sometimes loosely referred to as a Golden Scroll. The Academy also publishes Saturn Rings, its official organ.

See also
Academy of Motion Picture Arts and Sciences

References

External links
Official website

Culture of Los Angeles
Arts organizations established in 1972
Film-related professional associations
1972 establishments in California
American science fiction
Science fiction organizations
Horror fiction organizations
Fantasy organizations
Non-profit organizations based in Los Angeles